Tonzang(တွန်းဇန်) is a town, located in northern Chin State, western side of Myanmar. 
Tonzang is at about 37 miles north-eastern of Tedim town. 
The people who live in Tonzang are called Zo and Zomi.
They speak Zo, Zomi and Burmese Languages; and their cultures and living styles are same as the people in Tedim town. Moreover, there are other dialects follow those of Tonzang settlers' intonations and terms.
Tonzang township is under Falam district. 
A river called Manipur river, originated from India flows through the Western area of Tonzang. 
Christianity is the majority's religion.

External links 
Satellite map at Maplandia.com
Chin State site

Township capitals of Myanmar
Populated places in Chin State